Zabrachia polita is a species of soldier fly in the family Stratiomyidae.

References

Stratiomyidae
Insects described in 1901
Taxa named by Daniel William Coquillett
Diptera of North America